Ballymore  is a rugby union stadium situated in Herston, a suburb of Brisbane, Australia. It is the headquarters of Queensland Rugby Union and was the home ground of the Brisbane City team in the National Rugby Championship, until the league's disbandment in 2019. It is also used as a training facility for the Queensland Reds and Australian Wallabies rugby teams.

The stadium was the home ground of the Reds until they moved to Suncorp Stadium in 2006. The Brisbane Strikers football club also played at the ground prior to 2003. Ballymore was used as a training facility and headquarters for A-League club Brisbane Roar from 2008 to 2014.

History
The QRU set up headquarters at Ballymore in 1966 under a deed of grant from the state government. The first club game played at the new site was a match between Teachers and Wests. The QRU moved in February 1967. In March of the following year Ballymore's grandstand was officially opened. The Eastern Stand was opened on 21 June 1992. The ground exceeded capacity in 1993 when 26,000 watched the Wallabies play South Africa. A year later the first match under lights was played at the ground. Today the grandstand is known as the McLean Stand (named in 1982 after the McLean family). The Eastern stand is known as the Bank of QLD stand.

The Queensland Reds played their home matches at Ballymore from 1967 until 2005. Their Super Rugby matches were moved to Suncorp Stadium for the 2006 season but they still played their home games in the 2006 Australian Provincial Championship at Ballymore. The stadium also hosted the Ballymore Tornadoes during the only season of the Australian Rugby Championship in 2007.

Present use
Though the Reds have since moved out of Ballymore to Suncorp Stadium, which has almost three times the capacity, Ballymore is still the host to many rugby union matches. The Queensland Premier Rugby finals are held at the ground, and Queensland XV and off-season matches for the Reds are also played at Ballymore. Since 2014, the Brisbane City team in the National Rugby Championship has played home matches at the stadium.

The QRU has plans to redevelop the site to include a high performance centre comprising advanced sports medicine and training facilities, a gymnasium and aquatic facilities, as well as on-site accommodation for visiting teams, with Brisbane firm Blight Rayner as architects for the project. 

Ballymore was the planned home venue for Brisbane City's failed bid to join the A-League. In November 2018, a planned friendly football match between South Korea and Uzbekistan had to be moved to QSAC due to the poor state of the pitch.

In February 2021 demolition and construction works commenced on the stadium and surrounding precinct, to allow for the creation of the National Rugby Training Centre. The McLean Stand was demolished in February 2021, and will be replaced by the indoor training centre which includes a new grandstand capable of seating 3010 spectators, and also features corporate facilities, a 700 square-metre gym, rehabilitation areas, a 75-seat auditorium, a 120-seat function room, changing rooms and offices. A second rugby field with surrounding offices is included in the masterplan, though has not been constructed.

The National Rugby Training Centre will be the headquarters for the Australia women's national rugby union team (the Wallaroos) and a training site for the Queensland Reds men's, women's and academy teams.

Rugby World Cup
Ballymore hosted five matches of the 1987 Rugby World Cup. These matches were:

See also

 Rugby union in Queensland
 Queensland Rugby Union

References

External links
 Ballymore Redevelopment Proposal 
 
 “State of the art” Rugby Centre proposed for Ballymore

Rugby league stadiums in Australia
Rugby union stadiums in Australia
Rugby World Cup stadiums
Soccer venues in Queensland
Sports venues in Brisbane
Queensland Reds
Sports venues completed in 1966
Herston, Queensland
Ballymore Cup
A-League Women stadiums
1966 establishments in Australia
World Rugby Sevens Series venues
Venues of the 2032 Summer Olympics and Paralympics